Courtney Love is an American musician and actress who began her professional career in film in 1986 with a supporting role in Alex Cox's Sid and Nancy (1986); she had prior studied film with experimental director George Kuchar at the San Francisco Art Institute in 1984, and appeared in one of Kuchar's short films. After pursuing music and having a successful career as the frontwoman of alternative rock band Hole, Love also had intermittent roles in films, most notably receiving critical attention for her performance as Althea Flynt in Miloš Forman's 1996 biopic The People vs. Larry Flynt, which earned her a Golden Globe Nomination for Best Actress, as well as awards from the Boston, Chicago, New York, and Los Angeles film critics associations. Love later appeared among an ensemble cast in 200 Cigarettes (1998), as well as in a leading role in Man on the Moon (1999) alongside Jim Carrey, for which she received critical recognition. She later appeared in several independent films and short subjects as well as the thriller Trapped (2002) alongside Charlize Theron and Kevin Bacon, and Julie Johnson (2001), for which she received an award for Best Actress at Los Angeles' gay and lesbian Outfest film festival.

In 2014, Love joined the cast of the FX series Sons of Anarchy for the show's seventh and final season in a recurring role; this marked Love's debut role in a television series. Subsequent television work included appearances on the ABC-TV nighttime soap Revenge as well as the hit Lee Daniels drama Empire. In 2018, Love made a supporting appearance in director Justin Kelly's JT LeRoy.

Love has also appeared in a multitude of documentary films as both an interviewee as well as in archival and live footage, including the Sonic Youth documentary subject 1991: The Year Punk Broke (1992); Not Bad for a Girl (1995), which focused on women in alternative music; and Hit So Hard (2011), which documented the life of Love's bandmate, drummer Patty Schemel.

Films

Television

Documentaries

Music videos

See also
 Courtney Love discography
 List of awards and nominations received by Courtney Love

References

Sources

External links
 
 

Actress filmographies
Filmography
American filmographies